Iolaus glaucus is a butterfly in the family Lycaenidae. It is found in Israel, Jordan, western Saudi Arabia, Oman, Yemen, Ethiopia and Somalia.

References

Butterflies described in 1886
Iolaus (butterfly)
Butterflies of Africa
Taxa named by Arthur Gardiner Butler